Arantxa Elizabeth Chávez Muñoz (born 30 January 1991 in Leon, Mexico) is a Mexican diver. In 2012, she achieved qualification to participate at the 2012 Summer Olympics in the individual 3-metre trampoline event. At the Olympics, she failed to reach the semifinal and was classified 29th. In 2014, however, she was a gold winner, along with Dolores Hernández, in synchronized diving at the Central American Games of the Caribbean in 2014 in Veracruz.

After failing to qualify for the 2016 Summer Olympics, she considered retirement, before winning 3 medals at the 2017 World University Games. She qualified for the 2020 Summer Olympics. She did not advance to the semifinal and was classified 27th, the last of the field.

References

Notes

Sources
 dive meets

Mexican female divers
1991 births
Living people
Divers at the 2012 Summer Olympics
Olympic divers of Mexico
Divers from Mexico City
Divers at the 2015 Pan American Games
Universiade medalists in diving
Universiade bronze medalists for Mexico
Universiade gold medalists for Mexico
Medalists at the 2013 Summer Universiade
Medalists at the 2017 Summer Universiade
Pan American Games competitors for Mexico
Divers at the 2020 Summer Olympics
20th-century Mexican women
21st-century Mexican women